Walking on a Flashlight Beam is the fourth studio album by Lunatic Soul. The album was released on October 13, 2014 by Kscope.

Track listing

Charts

References

2014 albums
Kscope albums
Mystic Production albums